Aleksandar Glendža (born 1 December 1995) is a Montenegrin handball player for Romanian club Handball club Buzău and the Montenegro national team.

Club career
At club level, Glendža played in Montenegro (Budvanska rivijera), Serbia (Partizan, Jagodina, and Kolubara), Bosnia and Herzegovina (Leotar), Slovenia (Slovenj Gradec), Austria (UHK Krems), and Hungary (Balatonfüredi KSE).

International career
At international level, Glendža represented Montenegro at the 2020 European Championship.

References

External links
 MKSZ record

1995 births
Living people
People from Budva
Montenegrin male handball players
RK Partizan players
RK Kolubara players
Expatriate handball players
Montenegrin expatriate sportspeople in Serbia
Montenegrin expatriate sportspeople in Bosnia and Herzegovina
Montenegrin expatriate sportspeople in Slovenia
Montenegrin expatriate sportspeople in Austria
Montenegrin expatriate sportspeople in Hungary